Jacobus Balduinus (about 1175 – 10 April 1235) was an Italian jurist.

He was born in Bologna probably about 1175, and is reputed to have been of a noble family. He was a pupil of Azo, and the master of Odofredus, of the canonist Hostiensis (Henricus de Segusio), and of Jacobus de Ravanis (Jacques de Revigny), who taught at Orléans. His great fame as a professor of civil law at the University of Bologna caused Balduinus to be elected podestà of the city of Genoa, where he was entrusted with the reforms of the law of the Genoese Republic. He died at Bologna in 1235, and has left behind him some treatises on procedure.

References

External links
Works of Jacobus Balduinus at ParalipomenaIuris

1225 deaths
Jurists from Bologna
Academic staff of the University of Bologna
Legal history of Italy
13th-century Italian jurists
Year of birth uncertain